Coregonus confusus is a freshwater whitefish from Switzerland. It is also known by its native Swiss German common name, spelled pfärrit, pfarrig, and pfärrig. It was described as Coregonus annectens confusus by Victor Fatio in 1885 from syntypes which have been lost in 1902. The species is rare and only known with certainty from Lake Biel. There is also a possibility that it might occur in Lake Neuchâtel. It vanished from Lake Murten in the 1960s due to eutrophication and water level management.

References
Maurice Kottelat: European Freshwater Fishes.  A heuristic checklist of the freshwater fishes of Europe (exclusive of former USSR), with an introduction for non - systematists and comments on nomenclature and conservation; Biologia: Section Zoology vol. 52/5, Slovak Academic Press, Bratislava 1997,

External links
CREO Status

confusus
Freshwater fish of Europe
Fish described in 1885